Live at the Folklore Center NYC 1967 is a live album by Tim Buckley. The album was recorded at the Folklore Center in New York City, March 6, 1967.

Track listing
"Song for Jainie (Buckley) – 3:02
"I Never Asked to Be Your Mountain" (Buckley) – 4:17
"Wings" (Buckley) – 2:44
"Phantasmagoria in Two" (Buckley) – 3:18
"Just Please Leave Me" (Buckley) – 2:28
"Dolphins" (Fred Neil) – 4:32
"I Can't See You" (Buckley, Larry Beckett) – 4:05
"Troubadour" (Buckley) – 4:30
"Aren't You the Girl" (Buckley) – 2:57
"What Do You Do (He Never Saw You)" (Buckley) – 2:51
"No Man Can Find the War" (Buckley, Larry Beckett) – 3:19
"Carnival Song" (Buckley) – 2:43
"Cripples Cry" (Buckley) – 5:07
"If the Rain Comes" (Buckley) – 2:50
"Country Boy" (Buckley) – 4:04
"I Can't Leave You Loving Me" (Buckley) – 2:26

Personnel
Tim Buckley – Guitar, Vocals

References

Tim Buckley live albums
2009 live albums